David O'Callaghan (born 18 October 1983) is an Irish hurler who plays at right corner forward on the Dublin county team. He is a former dual player having represented the Dublin county football team between 2003 and 2007. O'Callaghan currently plays his club hurling for his home club St Mark's.

Playing career
O'Callaghan is a Dublin hurler, who made a decision in 2005 to concentrate on Gaelic football. O'Cllaghan has two Leinster senior football medals, although he is yet to establish himself as a player on the starting panel. O'Callaghan's club St Marks won the Senior Club Hurling 'B' Championship in 2006. O'Callaghan finished the game with a total of 0-05 points in the clubs famous victory. St Marks won the Intermediate championship in 2005 taking them to the Senior Club Hurling 'B' championship in 2006 and now this year's win will entitle the club to play in the 'A' championship with Dublin's top clubs. In honour of O'Callaghan's hurling club performances for St Marks in 2006, he was named on the 2006 Dublin Bus/Evening Herald Blue Star hurling XV.
He won the Leinster Minor Football Championship with Dublin in 2001.

2007
2007 started very well for O'Callaghan, he scored 2-5 (0-1f) against the Dublin Blue Stars in a challenge match which saw Dublin win by a scoreline of 3-17 to 0-12. His prolific form continued in Dublin's opening game of the O'Byrne Cup with O'Callaghan notching a 1-4 score in a game that Dublin comfortably won. Dublin and O'Callaghan progress to the quarter-final against Westmeath. He pulled off another scoring performance against Westmeath (1-01), a game which Dublin easily won. He won the 2007 O'Byrne Cup with Dublin against Laois at O'Connor Park in Offaly. The game finished on a scoreline of 1-18 to 2-13 against Laois. He failed to score in the O'Byrne Cup final. He failed to score in the final and therefore finished the tournament with a total of 2-5 (0-1f). After spending most of the 2007 National Football League on the bench for Dublin, Dotsy decided to retire from Dublin senior football. It was rumoured that Dotsy may have been defecting to the Dublin senior hurling panel but this rumour proved to be untrue. O'Callaghan will be travelling to the United States for the summer months.

2008
In 2008, O'Callaghan returned to the Senior Hurling panel and made his championship return against Westmeath in the Leinster Senior Hurling Championship. Dublin won the game by 3-21 to 0-11 with 'Dotsy' contributing a total of 1-06 (0-01f).

References

1983 births
Living people
Dual players
Dublin inter-county hurlers
Dublin inter-county Gaelic footballers
St Mark's Gaelic footballers
St Mark's hurlers